Kolappalur is a town  in Gobi Taluk of Erode district in the Indian state of Tamil Nadu.

Demographics

According to the 2001 India census, Kolappalur had a population of 8,717. Males constituted 50% of the population and females 50%.  Kolappalur had an average literacy rate of 89%, higher than the national average of 59.5%: male literacy was 92% and female literacy was 86%.  In Kolappalur, 20% of the population were under 6 years of age. There are ghosts which are often sighted at night time around the forest areas which surround the city. People in this area believe it to be the ghosts of the ancestors, who once lived in the village.

Education

 St. Mary's High School on G.D. Road in Kolappalur higher seconder school has State Board Co-Ed Tamil Medium Secondary School. The school has government-aided private management.  Another primary school has been managed by the same also 1 to 5 management. One primary school up to 5th Standard is run by the state government.

 Neighborhoods

Gobichettipalayam
Kunnathur
Perundurai
Thingalur
nambiyur

References

Cities and towns in Erode district